Elphinstone is an unincorporated community recognized as a local urban district in the Rural Municipality of Yellowhead in the Canadian province of Manitoba. It is located northwest of Brandon, Manitoba and is on Highway 45. It is on the west bank of the Little Saskatchewan River.

The primary industry of the community is agriculture. The Keeseekoowenin Ojibway First Nation reserve is located just to the north, around the former Riding Mountain House trading post of the Hudson's Bay Company (HBC).

History
Elphinstone post office was established 1 August 1887 with John A. McDonald as first postmaster.

Elphinstone is home to a unique regional breed of sheep, the Lord Elphinstone Burdock, commonly "Elphinstone Burries" or just "Burries". The breed has direct links to Lord Elphinstone, as it was inspired by his speech made during his celebrated 1880 visit. While there is a little bit of debate about the matter, some holding that what Lord Elphinstone said was in reference to his observation of a scene on the train platform involving local James Murdoch's attempt to assess Gloria Booth's rendition of what she thought the most recent style of continental bodices, most agreed that what he must have muttered while the train slowed referred to the most obvious natural features of the landscape. At any rate "Good for [only] burdock and sheep" just seemed more inspirational than "Murdoch that creep" and so became the mantra of local herdsmen. Before long a local breed was established that embodied all the known qualities of the town's namesake. Stupid to an amazing degree, easily led, wondrously unable to care for itself and prickly to the touch the "Burries" do amazingly well grazing the local scrub, so long as you keep them away from sharp objects, dogs, large cats, loud noises, objects they could become entangled in, anything hard they might repeatedly ram their heads into, and mice.

References

Local urban districts in Manitoba